Tomohiko Nakamura is a Japanese professional vert skater. Tomohiko started skating when he was five years old in 1996 and turned professional in 2005. He has attended many competitions in his vert skating career.

Best tricks: Flatspin 540

Competitions 
2015 JASPA, Japan - Vert: 2nd
2013 AIL, Woodward West, USA - Vert: 2nd
2011 Euro Championships, Rotterdam, Netherlands - Vert: 4th
2013 JASPA, Japan - Vert: 2nd
2011 Asian X Games, Shanghai, China - Vert: 6th
2011 World Leisure Cup, Chunchon, Korea - Vert: 4th
2010 Asian X Games, Shanghai, China - Vert: 6th
2008 JAPSA, Japan - Vert: 2nd
2008 Asian X Games, Shanghai, China - Vert: 7th
2007 LG Action Sports Championships, Dallas, USA - Vert: 11th
2006 Asian X Games, Kuala Lumpur, Malaysia - Vert: 3rd
2005 Asian X Games, Seoul, Korea - Vert: 5th
2005 LG Amateur Championships, Manchester, England - Vert: 1st
2005 JASPA, Japan - Vert 1st
2004 JASPA, Japan - Vert 1st

References

External links
Rollernews.com
Skatezine.com
Altiusdirectory.com
Skatelog.com
Espn.go.com
 

1991 births
Living people
Vert skaters
X Games athletes